Washford transmitting station is a medium wave broadcasting station and low-power digital terrestrial television relay near Washford, Somerset.

Originally the station used cage antennas around each mast. The station uses the frequencies 882 kHz with 100 kW, 1089 kHz with 50 kW and 1215 kHz with 50 kW.

A smaller  mast is used to relay digital terrestrial television services from the Mendip transmitting station. This mast carries the three public service multiplexes at an E.R.P. of 12.4 W.

The front portions of the old transmitter building,  are now part of the Tropiquaria wildlife park and house their tropical hall, aquarium, and nocturnal house.

Services available

Analogue radio (AM medium wave)

Digital television
Digital television began transmitting from Washford during the digital switchover in 2010. As a low-power relay, it only carries the three public service multiplexes.

Analogue television
Analogue television was transmitted from Washford until the digital switchover of the Mendip transmitter group between 24 March - 7 April 2010.

References

External links 
 http://tx.mb21.co.uk/gallery/gallerypage.php?txid=629

Buildings and structures in West Somerset
Radio masts and towers in Europe
Transmitter sites in England